Elim Constituency is an electoral constituency in the Omusati Region of Namibia. It had 15,210 inhabitants in 2004 and 7,883 registered voters . Its district capital is the settlement of Elim.

Elim borders to the north and west to the constituencies Okalongo and Oshikuku and in the east to the Oshana Region. There are a number of villages in the constituency, some being: Onashiku, Iiyale, Iino, Olupumbu, Iiyanguti, Olupembana, Ondangwa, Onegali, Onamega.

The constituency contains the homestead of Iipumpu Ya Tshilongo, king of the Uukwambi from 1907 to 1932. The homestead in Onashiku was proclaimed a national monument in 2014, and de-proclaimed a few months later.

Politics
Elim constituency is traditionally a stronghold of the South West Africa People's Organization (SWAPO) party. In the 2015 local and regional elections SWAPO candidate Gerhard Shiimi won uncontested and became councillor after no opposition party nominated a candidate. Councillor Shiimi (SWAPO) was reelected in the 2020 regional election. He obtained 2,775 votes, far ahead of Kilian Amupolo, an independent candidate with 511 votes.

References

Constituencies of Omusati Region
States and territories established in 1992
1992 establishments in Namibia